The Creole Petroleum Corporation was an American oil company. It was formed in 1920 to produce fields on Lake Maracaibo, Venezuela.  The company was acquired by Standard Oil of New Jersey in 1928. Until 1951 Creole Petroleum was the world's number one oil producer.

In 1950, Creole opened its refinery at Amuay bay.  This is now a part of the Paraguaná Refinery Complex considered the world's third largest refinery complex, just after Jamnagar Refinery (India) and Ulsan Refinery (South Korea).

The Venezuelan assets of Creole Petroleum Corporation were nationalized along with those of other foreign oil firms on January 1, 1976, becoming as  filial part of PDVSA, a Venezuelan government-owned operating company.

See also
Assignment: Venezuela (related propaganda film from 1956)

References

Defunct oil companies of the United States
American companies established in 1920
Defunct energy companies of Venezuela
Standard Oil
Oil and gas companies of Venezuela